The 1968–69 Divizia C was the 13th season of Liga III, the third tier of the Romanian football league system.

League tables

Seria I

Seria II

Seria III

Seria IV

Seria V

Seria VI

Seria VII

Seria VIII

Promotion play-off

Group I (București)

Group II (Cluj)

See also 

 1968–69 Divizia A
 1968–69 Divizia B
 1968–69 County Championship

References

Liga III seasons
3
Romania